Suboestophora altamirai is a species of air-breathing land snail, a terrestrial pulmonate gastropod mollusk in the family Trissexodontidae, within the Helicoidea.

This species is endemic to Spain.

References

Trissexodontidae
Endemic fauna of Spain
Gastropods described in 1962
Endemic molluscs of the Iberian Peninsula
Taxonomy articles created by Polbot